Dyllandro Panka (born 21 October 1998) is a Dutch professional footballer who plays for Quick Boys, as a forward.

References

1998 births
Living people
Dutch footballers
FC Volendam players
Quick Boys players
Tweede Divisie players
Eerste Divisie players
Association football forwards